The Driftin' Kid is a 1921 American short silent Western film directed by Albert Russell and featuring Hoot Gibson.

Cast
 Hoot Gibson
 Artie Ortego credited as Art Ortego
 Gertrude Olmstead
 Lulu Jenks credited as Lule B. Jenks
 Jim Corey
 Otto Nelson

See also
 List of American films of 1921
 Hoot Gibson filmography

External links
 

1921 films
1921 Western (genre) films
1921 short films
American silent short films
American black-and-white films
Films directed by Albert Russell
Silent American Western (genre) films
1920s American films
1920s English-language films